Catalina Yue (born May 19 in Toronto, Ontario) is a Canadian-American singer, songwriter, actress, model, producer, and businesswoman. A former Miss Universe Canada delegate, she is of Indonesian, Chinese, Japanese, and English ancestry.  Known for her work in both music and independent films, she has received several accolades, including two Hollywood Gold Awards, an International Motion Picture Award, and a nomination at Cannes Shorts.

Biography
Yue worked as a model and graduated from the Arts and Business Honors Co-op Program at the University of Waterloo in Waterloo, Ontario. For her debut album, Yue partnered with the UN Office of the High Commissioner for Refugees (UNHCR) of Canada, a United Nations agency mandated to protect and support refugees. An agency where Angelina Jolie serves as UN Ambassador. A portion of the proceeds made from the album goes towards protecting refugees worldwide. Yue's album, Eternally, was released internationally in HMV Stores.

Discography

Albums
 Eternally
 Catalina Yue (album)
"Ambition (feat. GILFOIL and Tony Brass)"
"Dreams"
"Ice and Fire"
"Tonight (Shadow)"
"Eternally"
"Loving You"
"Dignity"
"Deceptions"
"Like This, Like That (feat. Tony Brass)"
"Eternally (Re-Mix)"
"Bonus: UnPredictable (feat. A. SmYthE)"
"Bonus: Pray"
"Bonus: Superstar"

Singles
 "Eternally" (2009)
 "Loving You" (2009)
 "Ambition (feat. GILFOIL and Tony Brass)" (2010)
 "Driven" (2011)

Filmography

Features
The Great Chameleon (2012)
Just a Business (2017)
Escape Games (2021)
Duplicitous Minds (2022)

Television
Out of Time (2012)
Project Afterlife (2015)

Music Videos
"Ambition" by Catalina Yue featuring Tony Brass and GILFOIL (2010)
"Driven" by Catalina Yue (2011)

Awards and nominations

See also
 List of University of Waterloo people

References

External links
 
 
 UN High Commissioner for Refugees of Canada Website
 China News
 Sing Tao Newspapers

Year of birth missing (living people)
Living people
21st-century American pianists
21st-century Canadian actresses
21st-century Canadian pianists
21st-century Canadian women singers
Actresses from Toronto
American actresses of Chinese descent
American actresses of Japanese descent
American female models
American women pop singers
American women singer-songwriters
American models of Indonesian descent
American models of Japanese descent
American singer-songwriters
American film actresses
American film actors of Asian descent
American models of Chinese descent
American pianists
American women pianists
American television actresses
American musicians of Asian descent
American musicians of Chinese descent
American musicians of Japanese descent
Canadian actresses of Chinese descent
Canadian actresses of Indonesian descent
Canadian actresses of Japanese descent
Yue, Catalina
Canadian musicians of Japanese descent
Canadian beauty pageant winners
Canadian emigrants to the United States
Female models from Ontario
Canadian film actresses
Canadian people of English descent
Canadian women pianists
Canadian singer-songwriters
Canadian television actresses
Musicians from Toronto
University of Waterloo alumni
American women musicians of Japanese descent
21st-century American actresses